The General Aviation GA-43 was a single engine low-wing monoplane airliner produced in small numbers in the United States in the mid-1930s, also known as the Pilgrim 150, Fairchild 150, and sometimes but erroneously as the Clark GA-43 for the designer, Virginius E. Clark who was also responsible for the Clark Y airfoil section used.

The prototype was developed and built by Fairchild's American Pilgrim division, but the program was taken over by General Aviation when the firm purchased American Pilgrim shortly before the prototype had flown. Although this first flight took place in 1932, manufacture did not commence until 1934, by which time General Motors had, in turn, gained a controlling interest in North American Aviation and merged it with General Aviation, which they already owned. The result of this was that the GA-43 became the first aircraft produced by North American.

Development

The GA-43 was a conventional low-wing cantilever monoplane of all-metal construction. The prototype had fixed tailwheel landing gear, but the main units of this were later changed to be made retractable, and three of the four production examples also had retractable mainwheels, while the fourth aircraft had twin floats instead. The oval-section fuselage contained a ten-seat passenger cabin, and the cockpit was located atop the fuselage under a separate canopy.

Operators

 Sociedad Colombo Alemana de Transportes Aéreos (SCATA) (1 aircraft on floats)

 Líneas Aéreas Postales Españolas (LAPE) (1 aircraft)

 Swissair (2 aircraft)

Specifications

See also

References

Citations

Bibliography
 
 
 
 

Fairchild aircraft
1930s United States airliners
Single-engined tractor aircraft
Low-wing aircraft
Aircraft first flown in 1932